The Vietnam national baseball team is the national baseball team of Vietnam. The team represents Vietnam in international competitions.

International tournament results

SEA Games

National baseball teams in Asia
Baseball